This is the list of works by Petr Vaníček.

Remarks 
 B	Book
 TB	Textbook
 LN	Lecture Notes
 PR	Paper in a Refereed Journal
 R	Research Paper
 C	Critique, Reference Paper
 IP	Invited Paper to a Meeting
 NP	Paper Read at a Meeting
 TH	Thesis
 RT	Report (non-technical)
 RW	Review Paper (technical)

List of works

Sources 
 

Works about mathematics
Geodesy
Geophysics
University of New Brunswick